Andreas Szigat (born 27 September 1971 in Frankfurt an der Oder) is a German former swimmer who competed in the 1992 Summer Olympics.

References

1971 births
Living people
German male swimmers
German male freestyle swimmers
Olympic swimmers of Germany
Swimmers at the 1992 Summer Olympics
Olympic bronze medalists for Germany
Olympic bronze medalists in swimming
World Aquatics Championships medalists in swimming
Medalists at the 1992 Summer Olympics
21st-century German people
20th-century German people